Pretty Bird is a studio album by American country artist, Kathy Mattea. It was released on September 7, 2018 via Captain Potato Records and the Thirty Tigers label. It marked the first album of new material by Mattea in several years after enduring several vocal challenges in previous years. The album contained 11 tracks that mixed cover tunes with original material. Pretty Bird received positive reviews from critics upon its release and included four singles.

Background
Kathy Mattea was among country music's most commercially-successful artists during the eighties and nineties. She had a series of top ten and 20 singles on the American country charts, along with having albums certify gold and winning a Grammy Award. In 2002, she left her long-time Nashville record label in pursuit of other recording companies that would allow her to explore more creative musical avenues. She released a series of albums during the 2000s decade that included styles of Celtic, folk and Appalachian music. During the 2010s, Mattea began experiencing vocal problems that made her question whether she should continue performing. "It was emotionally really difficult because, when I felt my voice start to change, I thought, ‘Okay, so is this be beginning of the end? Or is this just a change?’," she told Billboard.

Mattea then found a Jazz vocal coach who helped her explore new ways for her to use her singing voice. She also began attempting to sing new material with her long-time guitarist, Bill Cooley. Her manager helped her find more shows where Mattea could perform and try out material, which ultimately helped give her the confidence to record a new album again. The result was her first new album in six years, Pretty Bird.

Recording and content
Pretty Bird was produced by Tim O'Brien. According to O'Brien, the album took about six months to create as both individuals had separate commitments to their own music careers. The disc contained a total of 12 tracks which mixed original material with covers of songs by other artists. The album mixed aspects of folk music, with Americana and country. The opening track, "Chocolate on My Tongue", was a cover of the original by The Wood Brothers. The second track, "Ode to Billie Joe", was first recorded and made popular by Bobbie Gentry. Also included is a cover of the traditional folk song, "He Moves Through the Fair", whose theme is centered on murder. Mattea also covers Mary Gauthier's "Mercy Now", which reflected the current political climate. "At their best, songs make us feel so not all alone when we’re going through something that’s really hard," Mattea commented. The title track (which is the closing song on the album) was first recorded and penned by Hazel Dickens. Songwriter (and Mattea's husband), Jon Vezner, contributed two new tracks to the album: "October Song" and "Tell Me What You Ache For".

Release, singles and reception

Pretty Bird was released on September 7, 2018 on Captain Potato Records in conjunction with the Thirty Tigers label. The album was offered as a compact disc or as a digital release. Four singles preceded the album's release. Both "I Can't Stand Up Alone" and "Ode to Billie Joe" were issued as singles on July 13, 2018. It was then followed by the release of "St. Theresa" and "Mercy Now" as singles on August 24, 2018. 

Pretty Bird received a mostly positive response from critics following its release. Bobby Moore of Wide Open Country commented that the disc is the "studio equivalent of a Nashville cafe's resident singer-songwriter adding less-obvious covers to her expected set." Steve Horowitz of PopMatters rated the album 7/10, praising the album's production by noting a difference in Mattea from previous works: "Mattea has been through a lot over the past half dozen years. It’s good she’s back, but she’s not the same as she once was." Jim Hynes of Country Standard Time praised Mattea's newfound vocal delivery in his review: "Age had helped open Mattea's lower register, and songs she'd previously shied away from suddenly emerged with a new vibrant life. Thankfully Mattea is back."

Track listing

Personnel
All credits are adapted from the liner notes of Pretty Bird and AllMusic.

Musical personnel
 Jim Brock – Drums, percussion
 Bill Cooley – Acoustic guitar, guitar
 Dennis Crouch – Bass
 Dan Dugmore – Steel guitar
 Ian Fitchuk – Drums, organ
 Viktor Krauss – Bass
 Jennifer Kummer – French horn
 Dougie MacLean – Vocal harmony
 Kathy Mattea – Acoustic guitar, background vocals, lead vocals
 Charlie McCoy – Bass, bass harmonica, harmonica, vibraphone
 Tim O'Brien – Acoustic guitar, background vocals, banjo, Bouzouki, cello, fiddle, electric guitar, mandolin
 Suzy Ragsdale – Background vocals
 Calvin Settles – Background vocals
 Odessa Settles – Background vocals
 Bobby Wood – Organ, Wurlitzer
 Oliver Wood – Vocal harmony

Technical personnel
 Eric Conn – Mastering
 Bill Cooley – Arranger
 Deborah Denson – Cover painting
 Kimberly Levitan – Package design
 Carl Marsh – Horn arrangements
 Kathy Mattea – Arranger
 Tim O'Brien – Producer
 Reto Sterchi – Photography
 Sean Sullivan – Engineer, mixing

Release history

References

2018 albums
Kathy Mattea albums
Thirty Tigers albums